Lee Harry Erwin (born 19 March 1994) is a Scottish professional footballer who plays as a striker for  club Ahed. He is a Scottish youth international, having played at the under-17, under-18 and under-19 levels.

Erwin has played for various sides in Scotland (namely Motherwell, Arbroath, Kilmarnock, Ross County and St Mirren) and England (Leeds United, Bury and Oldham Athletic). He also played in Iran for Tractor in 2018–19, in Finland for Haka in 2022 and in Lebanon for Ahed in 2022–23.

Club career

Motherwell
Erwin is a product of the Motherwell Academy. In the summer of 2012, he signed a three-year contract with the club.

On 30 August 2013, Erwin joined Scottish League One club Arbroath on an initial one-month loan deal The following day, he scored twice on his debut as Arbroath beat Brechin City 2–1; the loan period was twice extended for a further month. He left the Gayfield Park club having scored eight goals in 11 appearances.

Shortly after returning to Motherwell, Erwin suffered a serious knee injury in a Scottish Youth Cup match against Kilmarnock that looked like it could end his involvement that season, although he returned to feature for the under-20s before the end of the season.

On 17 July 2014, Erwin made his senior debut for Motherwell as a substitute in a 2–2 draw against Stjarnan in the UEFA Europa League Second qualifying round first leg after being promoted to the first team by Manager Stuart McCall. He scored his first goal for the club on his league debut, a 1–0 win against St Mirren on 9 August 2014.

On 29 April 2015, with Erwin's contract set to expire at the end of the 2014–15 season, Motherwell offered him a new three-year deal, however Erwin advised he would be concentrating on helping keep Motherwell in the Scottish Premiership before looking into his own future. After becoming a regular starter under new manager Ian Baraclough, who played Erwin as a central striker, he ended the 2014–15 season in fine form, scoring five goals in his last nine games of the season.

Erwin scored on the 28 May for Motherwell in a 3–1 victory over Rangers at Ibrox in the first leg of the SPFL Premiership relegation/promotion playoff. On 31 May, during the second leg against Rangers, Erwin won a penalty which was converted by John Sutton to help Motherwell record a 3–0 win and a 6–1 on aggregate victory to stay in the Premiership. However, after the match, Erwin was involved in an incident when he went to shake Rangers defender Bilel Mohsni's hand, Mohsni refused, which resulted in Erwin pushing Mohsni who reacted by kicking, then punching, Erwin, causing a mass brawl between the players. On 1 June, Police Scotland announced an investigation into the incident at Fir Park.  After initial reports that Erwin had been sent off after the game, the Scottish Football Association revealed that Erwin had only received a yellow card from referee Craig Thomson after the game for his part in the incident. He ended the season with six goals in 36 appearances (including the playoff matches) with 22 of the 36 games as a starter, and 14 coming off the bench.

On 2 June, Motherwell confirmed that they had offered Erwin a new three-year contract, but it was also reported that he had been offered a contract by Football League Championship club Leeds United, with compensation due to Motherwell should Erwin accept Leeds' offer instead.

Leeds United
After much speculation, on 10 June 2015 Erwin signed a three-year deal with Football League Championship club Leeds United. On 31 July, he was given the number 19 shirt for the upcoming 2015–16 season. After being an unused substitute under Uwe Rosler, in October 2015 Erwin moved to Bury on a 28-day loan. After playing three games, he returned to Leeds in November 2015, upon expiry of his loan, with new Leeds head coach Steve Evans stating he wanted to give Erwin a bigger opportunity to play. He made his Leeds debut on 21 November 2015, against Rotherham United in a controversial 1–0 defeat.

On 9 July 2016, Erwin signed for Oldham Athletic on a season-long loan. He scored his first goal for Oldham in a 3–2 loss against Shrewsbury Town on 3 September 2016.

In 40 appearances in all competitions for Oldham Athletic during the 2016–17 season, Erwin scored 10 goals (8 in the league), finishing the club's top goalscorer for the season.

Despite scoring four goals in his first two pre-season games back at Leeds United, on 13 July 2017 he and Toumani Diagouraga were deemed surplus to requirements at the club by new head coach Thomas Christiansen and were not named as part of Leeds' travelling squad to Kufstein in Austria.

Kilmarnock
Erwin signed a two-year contract with Kilmarnock in July 2017. He scored on his debut against Dumbarton on 21 July 2017, in the Scottish League Cup.

Tractor
Erwin moved to Iranian football in August 2018, signing with Tractor. On 9 November 2018, in Tractor's game against Zob Ahan, Erwin came on after 53 minutes and got the fastest hat-trick in Iran Pro League history in seven minutes.

Ross County
On 23 July 2019, Erwin signed for Scottish Premiership side Ross County on a two-year deal. He made his debut against Partick Thistle in the Scottish League Cup in a 3–2 defeat. His first goal for the club would come against Kilmarnock in the Scottish Premiership, a late winner in a 1–0 victory.

St Mirren
On 10 September 2020, Erwin signed a two-year contract with Scottish Premiership side St Mirren after the striker was allowed to leave Ross County due to ‘family reasons’. On 17 February 2022, St Mirren confirmed that Erwin had left the club after his contract was terminated by mutual consent.

Haka
Later that same day, Erwin signed a one-year deal with Haka in Finland.

Ahed
In November 2022, Lebanese Premier League club Ahed announced the signing of Erwin.So far he has scored 3 goals in 4 matches for them.

International career
Erwin has been capped by Scotland at under-17, under-18 and under-19 levels.

Personal life
His father, Harry, made 351 appearances in the Scottish Football League, playing for Airdrie, Stenhousemuir, Alloa and East Stirlingshire between 1978 and 1991.

Career statistics

Honours
Individual
Veikkausliiga Player of the Year: 2022
Veikkausliiga Striker of the Year: 2022
Veikkausliiga Team of the Year: 2022

References

External links
 

1994 births
Living people
Footballers from Bellshill
Scottish footballers
Scotland youth international footballers
Association football forwards
Motherwell F.C. players
Arbroath F.C. players
Scottish Professional Football League players
Leeds United F.C. players
Bury F.C. players
Oldham Athletic A.F.C. players
English Football League players
Kilmarnock F.C. players
Scottish expatriate footballers
Tractor S.C. players
Persian Gulf Pro League players
Ross County F.C. players
St Mirren F.C. players
FC Haka players
Al Ahed FC players

Expatriate footballers in Iran
Scottish expatriate sportspeople in Iran
Expatriate footballers in Finland
Scottish expatriate sportspeople in Finland
Expatriate footballers in Lebanon
Scottish expatriate sportspeople in Lebanon